Danny Tusitala (born 18 October 1991) is a New Zealand-born Samoan rugby union player, who plays as a scrum-half for Old Glory DC in Major League Rugby (MLR).

In October 2021, he joined  in the National Provincial Championship competition as an injury replacement for the remainder of their 2021 Bunnings NPC season.

Tusitala previously played for Auckland in the Mitre 10 Cup and Aurillac in the Pro D2. He has played for Samoa internationally in both the XV and sevens forms of the game.

References

1991 births
Living people
Rugby union players from Auckland
Expatriate rugby union players in the United States
New Zealand expatriate rugby union players
New Zealand expatriate sportspeople in the United States
Auckland rugby union players
Old Glory DC players
Hawke's Bay rugby union players
Samoa international rugby union players
Samoa international rugby sevens players
Rugby union scrum-halves
Stade Aurillacois Cantal Auvergne players